Prey is a 2009 Australian supernatural horror film directed by George T. Miller (though credited to Oscar D'Roccster), written by Miller and starring former Neighbours actress and Rogue Traders lead singer Natalie Bassingthwaighte, and American Jesse Johnson.

The film is the last directed by Miller before his death in February 2023.

Plot summary
In April 1987, two North Americans disappeared in the West Australian desert on a 4WD holiday. They were never seen alive again. Their abandoned vehicles and unused supplies were found in sand dunes near an Aboriginal sacred site less than an hour away from the closest town. Two years later, in May 1989, the two men were both found dead of natural causes, on the same day, 1,000 miles apart back in North America.

Twenty years after the original incident, 3 couples who set out on a surfing trip are lured into the same desert area, by a strange local whose master needs fresh victims to consume. Preconceived assumptions about friendship, undiscovered sexual liaisons, and false leadership come apart as the three couples realize that the vacation is over.

Cast
 Natalie Bassingthwaighte as Kate
 Jesse Johnson as Gus
 Natalie Walker as Ling
 Ben Kermode as Matt
 Christian Clark as Jason
 Kristin Sargent as Annika
 Nicholas Bell
 Pamela Shaw as Morgan Weismann
 Joe Hachem as Motel Operator
 Geire Kami as Patient
 Jennifer Hansen as Waitress
 Suhayb Lahdo as The Man
 Dawn Klingberg as Kora
 Stephen Beck as Pianist
 Jacqueline Steward as Confused Girl
 Zachary Schaefer as Bemused Pedestrian
 Taylor Johnson as Internet Enthusiast

Production
The outback had to be re-created in a Melbourne warehouse to save filming costs. In addition to a perforated eardrum which caused filming dates to be rescheduled, lead star Natalie Bassingthwaighte injured her ankle twice during filming, causing hassles regarding the physicality of her role. There was friction between the producers and director George T. Miller due to last minute script changes by Miller. Also, investor issues plagued the shoot and at one point the line-producers were hinting they were ready to walk. Bassingthwaighte was used in a lesbian shower that raised great controversy, but eventually made it to the final release.

Release
The film premiered on 5 May 2009 in Sydney and Melbourne, and was given a theatrical release on 9 May 2009 in Australia.

DVD release
The film was scheduled to have a U.S. DVD release on 13 July 2010 from Xenon Pictures under the new title "The Outback" or "Dreamtime's Over."

See also
Cinema of Australia

References

External links
 Official Website
 
 Prey Official Myspace

2009 films
2000s horror thriller films
2009 independent films
2000s supernatural horror films
Australian independent films
Australian thriller films
Films scored by Dale Cornelius
Horror films based on actual events
Films set in 1987
Films set in 1989
Films shot in Melbourne
Australian supernatural horror films
Films directed by George T. Miller
2000s English-language films